The 2020–21 NK Slaven Belupo season is the club's 114th season in existence and the 13th consecutive season in the top flight of Croatian football. In addition to the domestic league, Slaven Belupo will participate in this season's edition of the Croatian Cup. The season covers the period from 1 July 2020 to 30 June 2021.

Players

First-team squad

https://nk-slaven-belupo.hr/

Out on loan

Transfers

In

Out

Pre-season and friendlies

Competitions

Overview
Slaven Belupo started the season with a batch of mixed results, drawing 5 out of their 7 opening games. Their first win came on 16 October 2020 on matchday 8, with a scoreline of 5:1 against Istra 1961. Slaven Belupo stopped drawing games until the winter break, winning 4 out of 12 games. After the winter break, Slaven Belupo yet again entered drawing form, drawing 8 out of 14 games. After that, they stopped drawing again and lost 5 games in a row, coming closer to the relegation zone. Before the final matchday, Slaven Belupo were only 3 points above the relegation zone. Despiite the concerns, Slaven Belupo survived with a dramatic goal from Lovro Zvonarek, ensuring a 1:0 victory over relegation rivals NK Varaždin. Despite the survival and a 7th place finish, Tomislav Stipić was sacked on 10 June 2021 after just 2 wins after the winter break.

HT Prva liga

League table

Results summary

Results by round

Matches

Croatian Football Cup

Statistics

Goalscorers

References

External links

NK Slaven Belupo seasons
Slaven Belupo